Hakea pulvinifera is a small, prickly shrub in the family Proteaceae, found only on one rocky hillside near Gunnedah in New South Wales, Australia. The species was first described in 1962, believed extinct in 1971 and rediscovered in 1988. The entire species may be of only one genetically unique individual.

Description
The flowers are arranged in groups of forty to fifty creamy-white and green flowers in leaf axils. Flowering occurs from September to November but the pollen grains are shrivelled and empty. Fruit have never been seen on plants of this species.

Taxonomy and naming
This species was first formally described by Australian taxonomic botanist Lawrence Alexander Sidney Johnson in 1962 and the description was published in Contributions from the New South Wales National Herbarium.  The specific epithet is from the Latin pulvinus meaning "cushion", "pad" or "pillow" and fero meaning "to bear" or "to carry" referring to the swelling at the base of the leaf.

Hakea pulvinifera was only discovered in 1949 from a single population but the species was not named until 1962. The population was visited again in 1966 and detailed information recorded; however, in 1971 a search based on the 1966 data failed to locate the species. It was proposed the species was extinct, the type population having been lost in the construction of a car park. In 1988 a National Parks and Wildlife Service ranger, S.P. Morrison, "discovered" the species in a localised population on a steep hillside similar in features and aspect to the type locality, using information from  Lawrence Johnson's original 1962 notes. The "newly found" population is almost certainly the same one first recorded, despite certain differences in landmarks between this locality and that previously described. The identity of the population was confirmed by William Robert Barker. Fresh, fixed and dried flowers tested have been found to be sterile, with no evidence of viable pollen, suggesting that the species cannot reproduce from seed. Instead, they are likely to regenerate by suckering from roots running below the soil surface.

Distribution and habitat
A restricted species found only in the Northern Tablelands of New South Wales where it grows on a steep, barren slope.

Conservation status
Hakea pulvinifera is classified as "endangered" by the Australian Government Environment Protection and Biodiversity Conservation Act 1999 and the New South Wales Government Threatened Species Conservation Act and a recovery plan has been prepared.

References

pulvinifera
 Flora of New South Wales
 Plants described in 1962